The 2021 Atlanta mayoral election occurred on November 2, 2021, with a runoff between the top two candidates taking place on November 30. Incumbent mayor Keisha Lance Bottoms did not seek reelection. City council member Andre Dickens defeated council president Felicia Moore in the runoff by a margin of more than 20%. Candidates eliminated in the general election included former mayor Kasim Reed and attorney Sharon Gay.

Candidates

On ballot
Antonio Brown, Atlanta City Councilman, District 3 (D); declared May 12, 2021
Andre Dickens, Atlanta City Councilman, At-Large Post 3 (D); declared May 13, 2021
Kirsten Dunn, real estate investor
Nolan English
Sharon Gay, attorney; declared April 2021
Mark Hammad (I)
Kenneth Hill, nonprofit founder
Rebecca King, insurance executive
Felicia Moore, President of the Atlanta City Council (D); declared January 28, 2021
Kasim Reed, former Mayor of Atlanta (2010–2018) (D); declared June 8, 2021
Walter Reeves, legal scholar
Roosevelt Searles III, businessman (I); declared June 7, 2021
Richard Wright, public accountant (D); declared July 20, 2021
Glenn Wrightson, candidate for mayor in 2017

Write-in candidates
Brandon Adkins
 Henry Anderson
Alex Barrella, cartoonist (G); declared January 1, 2021
Raina Bell-Saunders, minister (D); declared July 17, 2021
Devonta "Sully" Sullivan (R)

Did not file
Daniel Davenport
Rachele Fruit (SWP)
Jonathan Geter
Amanda McGee
Robert Wilkes

Withdrew
Keisha Lance Bottoms, incumbent Mayor of Atlanta (D); declared January 5, 2020, withdrew May 6, 2021

General election

Endorsements

Polling
Graphical summary

Fundraising

Results

Mayoral debate
The top 6 candidates participated in a televised debate on Wednesday, October 13, 2021. The debate was broadcast on 11Alive.

Runoff
Sharon Gay, who was eliminated in the general election, endorsed Dickens in the runoff.

Polling

Results

Results by county

Notes

Partisan clients

References

External links
Official campaign websites
 Roosevelt Searles III (I) for Mayor 
Keisha Lance Bottoms (D) for Mayor (withdrawn)
 Alex Barrella (G) for Mayor
 Felicia Moore (D) for Mayor
 Sharon Gay for Mayor
 Antonio Brown (D) for Mayor
 Andre Dickens (D) for Mayor
 Kasim Reed (D) for Mayor
Rebecca King for Mayor
Devonta "Sully" Sullivan (R) for Mayor

2021
Atlanta
Atlanta
Mayoral election